Novozvanivka is a village in Sievierodonetsk Raion (district) in Luhansk Oblast of eastern Ukraine. On May 16, 2022, the Luhansk People's Republic militia took control over the village from the Ukrainian Armed Forces.

Demographics
Native language as of the Ukrainian Census of 2001:
Ukrainian 77.38%
Russian 22.02%

References

External links
 Weather forecast for Novozvanivka

Villages in Sievierodonetsk Raion